Dichelopa fulvistrigata is a species of moth of the family Tortricidae. It is found on Tahiti.

References

Moths described in 1928
Dichelopa